Heliothis is a genus of moths in the family Noctuidae. It was first described by Ferdinand Ochsenheimer in 1816. Some of the species have larvae which are agricultural pests on crop species such as tobacco, cotton, soybean and pigeon pea. Some species originally in this genus have been moved to other genera, see Chloridea and Helicoverpa.

Taxonomy
Several species of moths of agricultural importance that used to be placed in this genus now are classified as members of the genus Helicoverpa, such as the corn earworm, Helicoverpa zea. The species subflexa, tergemina, and virescens are now members of the genus Chloridea.

Description
The proboscis is fully developed. Palpi porrect (extending forward) and second joint evenly clothed with long hair. The third joint is short and depressed and a short frontal shift. Thorax and abdomen without tufts. Fore tibia has a pair of slender terminal spines, whereas mid and hind tibia also spined. Forewings with veins 8 and 9 sometimes given off from the end of the areole.

Species

 Subgenus Heliothis:
 Heliothis acesias Felder & Rogenhofer, 1872
 Heliothis australis Hardwick, 1994
 Heliothis belladonna (H. Edwards, 1881)
 Heliohis borealis (Hampson, 1903)
 Heliothis conifera (Hampson, 1913)
 Heliothis cystiphora (Wallengren, 1860)
 Heliothis flavescens (Janse, 1917)
 Heliothis flavigera (Hampson, 1907)
 Heliothis fuscimacula (Janse, 1917)
 Heliothis hoarei Matthews, 1999
 Heliothis lucilinea Walker, 1858
 Heliothis maritima Graslin, 1855
 Heliothis metachrisea (Hampson, 1903)
 Heliothis melanoleuca Mitchell, 1997
 Heliothis molochitina (Berg, 1882)
 Heliothis nubigera Herrich-Schäffer, [1851]
 Heliothis ononis (Denis & Schiffermüller, 1775)
 Heliothis oregonica (H. Edwards, 1875)
 Heliothis pauliani Viette, 1959
 Heliothis peltigera (Denis & Schiffermüller, 1775)
 Heliothis perstriata (Brandt, 1941)
 Heliothis philbyi (Brandt, 1941)
 Heliothis phloxiphaga Grote & Robinson, 1867
 Heliothis proruptus Grote, 1873
 Heliothis punctifera Walker, 1857
 Heliothis roseivena (Walker, 1866)
 Heliothis scutuligera Guenée, 1852
 Heliothis sturmhoefeli Draudt, 1927
 Heliothis viriplaca (Hufnagel, 1766)
 Heliothis xanthia Angulo y Olivares, 1999
 Heliothis xanthiata Walker, 1865

 Subgenus Masalia:
 Heliothis albida (Hampson, 1905)
 Heliothis albipuncta (Hampson, 1910)
 Heliothis cruentata (Moore, 1881)
 Heliothis decorata (Moore, 1881)
 Heliothis disticta (Hampson, 1902)
 Heliothis galatheae (Wallengren, 1856)
 Heliothis leucosticta (Hampson, 1902)
 Heliothis nubila (Hampson, 1903)
 Heliothis philbyi (Brandt, 1941)
 Heliothis perstriata (Brandt, 1941)
 Heliothis quilengesi Seymour, 1972
 Heliothis sublimis (Berio, 1962)
 Heliothis transvaalica (Distant, 1902)
 Heliothis uncta (Swinhoe, 1885)

 Subgenus Timora (also treated as a separate genus):
 See: Timora

References

External links
 

 
Heliothinae
Taxa named by Ferdinand Ochsenheimer